Agnes of Meissen (born before 1264 – died after September 1332) was a noblewoman, the daughter of Albert II, Margrave of Meissen and his wife Margaret of Sicily.

Agnes was married with Henry I "the Marvelous" of Brunswick-Grubenhagen, in 1282. They had 16 children:
 Elizabeth (born c. 1282), married Frederick, Count of Beichlingen
 Otto (born c. 1283, died in or before 1309)
 Albert (born c. 1284, died after 1341), joined the Teutonic Order
 Adelaide (1285–1320), married King Henry I of Bohemia
 Facie (daughter; born c. 1286, died before or in 1312)
 Agnes, Abbess of Osterode 
 Henry II, Duke of Brunswick-Lüneburg
 Frederick 
 Adelheid of Brunswick, married to Andronikos III Palaiologos
 Conrad (c. 1294 – c. 1320)
 Mechtild (c. 1295 – 14 March 1344), married John II of Werle
 Ernest I, Duke of Brunswick-Grubenhagen 
 William, Duke of Brunswick-Grubenhagen 
 Richardis, Abbess of Osterode 
 Margaret (born c. 1300, died in or after 1312)
 John I, Duke of Brunswick-Grubenhagen

References 

Year of birth uncertain
1332 deaths
House of Wettin
Duchesses of Brunswick-Lüneburg
Daughters of monarchs